Saviour's Church may refer to:

 Saviour Church, Moscow Kremlin
 Church of the Savior on Blood, a Russian Orthodox church in St. Petersburg, Russia
 Saviour Church on Sennaya Square, a Russian Orthodox church in St. Petersburg, Russia
 Saviour's Church, Baku, a Lutheran church in Baku, Azerbaijan

See also
 Church of Our Saviour (disambiguation)
St Saviour's Church